By the Dawn's Early Light is an album by composer Harold Budd. It was first released in 1991 by the Warner Bros. and WEA record labels, and subsequently re-released with new cover art in 2006 by All Saints Records. The album is typical of Budd's signature minimalist style, and features several short poems, each read by Budd himself.

Track listing 
 "Aztec Hotel (Poem)" – 1:33
 "Boy About 10" – 4:59
 "Arcadia" – 2:00
 "Dead Horse Alive with Flies" – 3:40
 "The Photo of Santiago McKinn" – 6:55
 "The Corpse at the Shooting Gallery" – 2:57
 "Albion Farewell" – 2:38
 "Distant Lights of Olancha Recede (Poem)" – 1:27
 "Down the Slopes to the Meadow" – 7:39
 "She Dances by the Light of the Silvery Moon" – 2:12
 "Blind Bird" – 2:03
 "Saint's Name Spoken" – 3:59
 "The Place of Dead Roads" – 4:50
 "A Child in a Sylvan Field" – 3:36
 "Boy About 10 (Poem)" – 1:18
 "Wings (Poem)" – 0:37
 "Advent (Poem)" – 0:49

Additional track from release by Opal/Warner Bros Records
"No Name (Poem)"  – 0:55

References 

 Track titles can be verified through the Amazon.com product page.

Harold Budd albums
1991 albums
Warner Records albums
All Saints Records albums
Ambient albums by American artists